Trouble Chasers is a 1945 American comedy film directed by Lew Landers and starring Billy Gilbert and Shemp Howard.

Plot
A valuable necklace is stolen, and a couple of gangsters think that 3 inept stooges know where it is.

Cast
 Billy Gilbert as Billy
 Maxie Rosenbloom as Maxie
 Shemp Howard as Shemp Howard
 Gloria Marlen as Nora Nolan
 Carlyle Blackwell Jr. as Tommy Young
 Barbara Pepper as Goldie
 I. Stanford Jolley as Lefty Reed
 Wheeler Oakman as Dek Sharp
 Patsy Moran as Mrs. Tubbs
 Budd Buster as Mr. X
 Emmett Lynn as Mr. Fuddy
 Milton Kibbee as H. G. Hogan

References

External links

1945 films
American comedy films
1945 comedy films
American black-and-white films
Films with screenplays by George H. Plympton
Films about jewellery
Films about theft
Monogram Pictures films
Films directed by Lew Landers
1940s American films